Glycogenin-1 is an enzyme that is involved in the biosynthesis of glycogen. It is capable of self-glucosylation, forming an oligosaccharide primer that serves as a substrate for glycogen synthase. This is done through an inter-subunit mechanism. It also plays a role in glycogen metabolism regulation. Recombinant human glycogenin-1 was expressed in E. coli and purified by using conventional chromatography techniques.

Glycogen metabolism 

Glycogen is a multi-branched polysaccharide. It is primary means of glucose storage in animal cells. In the human body, the two main tissues which store glycogen are liver and skeletal muscle. Glycogen is typically more concentrated in the liver, but because humans have much more muscle mass, our muscles store about three quarters of the total glycogen in our body.

Location of glycogen 

The function of liver glycogen is to maintain glucose homeostasis, generating glucose via glycogenolysis to compensate for the decrease of glucose levels that can occur between meals. Thanks to the presence of the glucose-6-phosphatase enzyme, the hepatocytes are capable of turning glycogen to glucose, releasing it into blood to prevent hypoglycemia. 

In skeletal muscle, glycogen is used as an energy source for muscle contraction during exercise. The different functions of glycogen in muscle or liver make the regulation mechanisms of its metabolism differ in each tissue. These mechanisms are based mainly on the differences on structure and on the regulation of the enzymes that catalyze synthesis, glycogen synthase (GS), and degradation, glycogen phosphorylase (GF).

Glycogen synthesis
Glycogenin is the initiator of the glycogen biosynthesis. This protein is a glycosyl transferase  that have the ability of autoglycosilation using UDP-glucose, which helps in the growth of itself until forming an oligosaccharide made by 8 glucoses. Glycogenin is an oligomer, and it's capable of interacting with several proteins. In recent years, a family of proteins has been identified, the GNIPs (glycogenin-interacting protein), that interacts with glycogenin stimulating its autoglycolsilation activity.

Glycogenin-1
In humans, two isoforms of glycogenin can be expressed: glycogenin-1, with a molecular weight of 37 kDa and codified  by GYG1 gen, which is expressed mostly in muscles;  and glycogenin-2, with a molecular weight of 66 kDa and codified by GYG2 gen, which is expressed mainly in liver, cardiac  muscle and other types of tissue, but not in skeletal muscle.
Glycogenin-1 was described by analyzing the glycogen of skeletal muscle. It was determined that this molecule was united by a covalent bond to each mature molecule of muscular glycogen.

Gene

Structure 
The glycogenin-1 gene, which spans over 13kb, consists of seven exons and six introns. Its proximal promoter contains a TATA box, a cyclic AMP responsive element, and two putative Sp1 binding sites in a CpG island, a DNA region with a high frequency of CpG sites. There are also nine E-boxes that bind the basic helix-loop-helix of muscle-specific transcription factors.

Location and transcription 
The GYG1 gene is located on the long arm of the chromosome 3, between positions 24 and 25, from base pair 148,709,194 to base pair 148,745,455.

Transcription of human glycogenin-1 is mainly initiated at 80bp and 86bp upstream the translator’s codon beginning. Transcriptions factors have different binding sites for its development, some examples are: GATA, activator protein 1 and 2 (AP-1 and AP-2), and numerous potential Octamer-1 binding sites.

Deficiency 
A Glycogenin-1 deficiency leads to Glycogen storage disease type XV.

Mutation 
Deficiency of glycogenin-1 is detected in the sequence of the glycogenin-1 gene, GYG1, which revealed a non-sense mutation in one allele and a missense mutation, Thr83Met, in the other. The missense mutation resulted in inactivation of the autoglycosylation of glycogenin-1, which is necessary for the priming of glycogen synthesis in muscle.
Autoglycosylation of glycogenin-1 occurs at Tyr195 by a gulose-1-O-tyrosine linkage. An induced missense mutation of this residue results in inactivated autoglycosylation. However, missense mutation affecting some other residues of glycogenin-1 has also been shown to eliminate autoglycosilation.

Consequences 
The phenotypic features of the skeletal muscle in a patient with this disorder are muscle glycogen depletion, mitochondrial proliferation, and a marked predominance of slow-twitch, oxidative muscle fibres. The mutations in the glycogenin-1 gene GYG1 are also a cause of cardiomyopathy and arrhythmia.

See also 
 Glucose
 Glycogen
 Glycogen synthase
 Glycogenin
 Gene
 Mutation

References

External links 

 
 

Glycobiology